Kataiya is a town and a notified area in Gopalganj district in the Indian state of Bihar.

Geography 

Demographics
 India census, Kateya had a population of 17,896. Males constitute 52% of the population and females 48%. Kateya has an average literacy rate of 42%, lower than the national average of 59.5%: male literacy is 53%, and female literacy is 30%. In Kateya, 19% of the population is under 6 years of age.

References

Cities and towns in Gopalganj district, India